Wollaston Island is an island off the Kimberley coast of Western Australia.

Threatened priority fauna found on the island include the golden-backed tree-rat, monjon and the golden bandicoot.

References

Islands of the Kimberley (Western Australia)